Fruitland High School is a four-year public secondary school in Fruitland, Idaho, the only traditional high school in Fruitland School District #373. One of three high schools in Payette County in southwestern Idaho, FHS had an enrollment of 494 in the 2011–2012 school year.

Athletics
Fruitland competes in athletics in IHSAA Class 3A in the Snake River Valley Conference with Homedale, Parma, Payette, and Weiser.

State titles
Boys
 Football (5): fall (A-3, now 2A) 1993; (3A) 2006, 2010  2016, 2017
 Basketball (5): (A-3, now 2A) 1980; (3A) 2008, 2011, 2012, 2018 
 Wrestling (1): (3A) 2014
 Baseball (8): (3A) 2002, 2008, 2009, 2011, 2012, 2014, 2015  2016  (records not kept by IHSAA)
 Track (1): (A-3, now 2A) 1977 
Girls
 Soccer (1): fall (3A) 2008 
 Volleyball (2): fall (3A) 2012, 2014 
 Tennis (2): (3A) 2011, 2012

Alumni

 Jordan Gross – NFL offensive tackle, Carolina Panthers, class of 1998
 Timothy J. Edens; U.S. Army Brigadier General, class of 1977
 Tom Edens – former MLB Pitcher, class of 1979

References

External links

MaxPreps.com – Fruitland Grizzlies
Fruitland School District

Public high schools in Idaho
Schools in Payette County, Idaho